Banī 'Obeīd is one of the districts  of Irbid governorate, Jordan.

References 

 
Districts of Jordan